The UK Albums Chart is one of many music charts compiled by the Official Charts Company that calculates the best-selling albums of the week in the United Kingdom. Before 2004, the chart was only based on the sales of physical albums. This list shows albums that peaked in the Top 10 of the UK Albums Chart during 1998, as well as albums which peaked in 1997 and 1999 but were in the top 10 in 1998. The entry date is when the album appeared in the top ten for the first time (week ending, as published by the Official Charts Company, which is six days after the chart is announced).

The first new number-one album of the year was Titanic: Music from the Motion Picture by James Horner. Overall, twenty-one different albums peaked at number-one in 1998, with Robbie Williams (2) having the most albums hit that position.

Background

Best-selling albums
The Corrs had the best-selling album of the year with Talk on Corners. Ladies & Gentlemen: The Best of George Michael by George Michael came in second place. Where We Belong by Boyzone, Life Thru a Lens by Robbie Williams and I've Been Expecting You by Robbie Williams made up the top five. Albums by The Verve, Madonna, Celine Dion, All Saints and James Horner were also in the top-ten best selling albums of the year.

Top-ten albums
Key

See also
1998 in British music
List of number-one albums from the 1990s (UK)

References
General

Specific

External links
1998 album chart archive at the Official Charts Company (click on relevant week)

United Kingdom top 10 albums
Top 10 albums
1998